Ziva may refer to:

 Given name
 Ziva Ben-Porat, an Israeli writer and literary theorist
 Ziva David, a fictional character on the American TV series NCIS
 Ziva Kunda (1955–2004), a Canadian social psychologist
 Ziva Rodann, an Israeli actress
 Other uses
 Ziva (crustacean), an extinct genus of crustaceans in the order Palaeocopida
 Ziva (dish), an Israeli pastry

See also 
 Živa (disambiguation)
 Zivah